Henry Francis Hope Pelham-Clinton-Hope, 8th Duke of Newcastle-under-Lyne (3 February 1866 – 20 April 1941) was an English nobleman.

Biography
Born in 1866, Hope was son of Henry Pelham-Clinton, 6th Duke of Newcastle. He was educated at Eton College and Trinity Hall, Cambridge.

He inherited the estate of his grandmother, Anne Adele Hope (widow of Henry Thomas Hope) in 1884, upon condition that he assume the name and arms of Hope upon reaching his majority; he did so in 1887 and became known as Lord Francis Hope. This bequest included the well-known Hope Diamond. Lord Francis held a commission as Lieutenant of the Nottinghamshire (Sherwood Rangers) Yeomanry until he resigned in April 1894. He was Sheriff of Monaghan for 1897 and 1917.

He married American actress May Yohé in November 1894. She had gained fame on the London stage in 1893 and 1894, especially in the burlesque Little Christopher Columbus. He led an extravagant lifestyle, which the two continued together, and was discharged in bankruptcy in 1896. One journal wrote: "Pecuniary troubles, however, embarrassed the two but slightly. A future Duke and Duchess can always beg or borrow, and they did. In 1900 they made a tour of the world, and on their way home fell in with Captain [Putnam] Bradlee Strong, at that time one of the handsomest and most popular men in the United States Army, and a special favourite with President McKinley. The actress fell head over ears in love with him. She refused to return to England with Lord Francis".  During the marriage, Yohé continued to perform on stage in London.  

Hope divorced Yohé in 1902; at this time, he obtained court permission to sell off the Hope Diamond to pay some of his debts. After lengthy litigation in the Court of Chancery, he was able to break the entail on most of his grandmother's trusts, and sold 'Deepdene', Dorking, Surrey and Castleblayney in County Monaghan, Ireland.

Lord Francis married Olive Muriel Owen, née Thompson, in 1904. They had 3 children:
Henry Edward Hugh Pelham-Clinton-Hope, 9th Duke of Newcastle-under-Lyne (1907–1988)
Lady Doria Lois Pelham-Clinton-Hope (1908–1942)
Lady Mary Pelham-Clinton-Hope (1910–1982)

He inherited the dukedom from his brother in 1928 and died in 1941 aged 75 at Clumber Park.

Papers relating to the 8th Duke's affairs are now held at Manuscripts and Special Collections, The University of Nottingham.

References

External links
Biography of the 8th Duke, with links to online catalogues, from Manuscripts and Special Collections at The University of Nottingham
Find a grave

1866 births
1941 deaths
19th-century English nobility
20th-century English nobility
People educated at Eton College
Alumni of Trinity Hall, Cambridge
High Sheriffs of Monaghan
008
Francis
Francis
Sherwood Rangers Yeomanry officers